Raytheon Intelligence & Space (RIS) is one of the four business segments of U.S. defense and aerospace conglomerate Raytheon Technologies. Headquartered in Arlington, Virginia, RIS has a total employment of 39,000 and 2019 sales of US$15 billion. Roy Azevedo is the segment's president.

Raytheon Intelligence & Space is the result of a merger between two former Raytheon Company businesses: Raytheon Intelligence, Information and Services (IIS) and Raytheon Space and Airborne Systems (SAS). The merger was finalized on the day that Raytheon Technologies was formed,  on 3 April 2020.

Raytheon Technologies completed its acquisition of satellite manufacturer Blue Canyon Technologies of Boulder, Colorado on 22 December 2020.

BBN Technologies is a part of RIS.

Key RIS capabilities combine key SAS, IIS, and BBN capabilities.

Key SAS capabilities include:
 Satellite sensors for missile defense and Earth observation
 Airborne sensors including radar and electro-optical/infrared (EO/IR) sensors
 Electronic warfare (EW)
 High Energy Laser (HEL)

Key IIS capabilities include:
 Satellite signal processing and GEOINT
 Cyber operations
 Training and mission support

Key BBN capabilities include:
 Acoustic signal processing
 Quantum computing
 Artificial Intelligence

The division's products and contracts include:

 Visible Infrared Imaging Radiometer Suite (VIIRS)
 AN/APG-79 AESA radar for the Boeing F/A-18E/F Super Hornet
 AN/APG-82(V)1 AESA radar for the F-15E Strike Eagle
 Development, Operations and Maintenance (DOMino) cybersecurity for the .gov domain
 GPS Next-Generation Operational Control System (OCX) ground control
 Jordan Border Security Project
 Boomerang gunfire locator

RIS has significant engineering and manufacturing facilities in El Segundo, California, and in McKinney, Texas; an electronic warfare center in Goleta, California; and a consolidated manufacturing facility in Forest, Mississippi.

References

External links 
 

Raytheon Technologies
Aerospace companies of the United States
Defense companies of the United States
Companies based in McKinney, Texas
Manufacturing companies based in Texas